Goodnow Hall may refer to:

Goodnow Hall (Grinnell College), Grinnell, Iowa, listed on the NRHP in Poweshiek County, Iowa
Goodnow Hall (Kansas State University), Manhattan, Kansas
Goodnow Hall, Huguenot College, Wellington, a heritage site in the Western Cape Province, South Africa
The town hall of Charlemont, Massachusetts

Architectural disambiguation pages